Meysam Depot ( – Amādegāh-e Meys̱am) is a village in Zanjanrud-e Bala Rural District, in the Central District of Zanjan County, Zanjan Province, Iran. At the 2006 census, its population was 853, in 226 families.

References 

Populated places in Zanjan County